Afro-Anguillians or Black Anguillians are Anguillian whose ancestry lies within the continent of Africa, most notably West Africa.

As of 2013, people of solely African descent are the majority ethnic group in Anguilla, accounting for 90.1% of the country's population. An additional 4.6% of the country is mulatto.

History

Before the arrival of Europeans in the Caribbean, Anguilla was inhabited by Arawakan-speaking Native Americans who called the Island Malliouhana. Anguilla was colonized in 1650 by British settlers from Saint Kitts and thereafter become a British colony. The British did not encounter any Arawaks in Anguilla, but in 1656 a raid by Native Americans from one of the neighbouring islands wiped out their settlement. The early years were difficult for the European colonists.  Due to increase demand for sugar in Europe, British colonizers began producing sugarcane using enslaved Africans.

References and footnotes 

Anguilla
 
Ethnic groups in Anguilla
People of African descent